Mircea II (1428–1447) was the Voivode, or prince, of Wallachia in 1442. He was the oldest son of Vlad II Dracul and brother of Vlad Țepeș and Radu the Handsome. He was the grandson of his namesake Mircea cel Bătrân.

Early life 
Mircea was the eldest son of Vlad Dracul, the future voivode (or prince) of Wallachia. According to the Burgundian crusader, Walerand of Wavrin, Mircea was about 15 years old in 1443, suggesting that Mircea had been born around 1428. The first document to mention Mircea (and his younger brother, Vlad Dracula) was issued on 20 January 1437. In that charter, their father (who was already the ruler of Wallachia) referred to Mircea and Vlad as his "first born sons". According to a widely accepted scholarly theory, "Cneajna" from Moldavia (a daughter of Alexander I of Moldavia) was Mircea's mother.

Reign 
The Ottoman Sultan, Murad II, summoned Vlad Dracul to Edirne to do homage to him in March 1442. Before leaving Wallachia, Vlad Dracul appointed Mircea to rule Wallachia during his absence. The sultan accused Vlad Dracul of treachery and ordered his imprisonment. He also sent a force of 12,000 to invade Wallachia.

In 1436, Mircea II's father Vlad Dracul succeeded in regaining the throne of Wallachia following the death of his half-brother Alexandru I Aldea. Mircea II ruled in his father's absence beginning in 1442 when his father was away at the Ottoman court. His father's allied stance with the Ottoman Empire made him an enemy of John Hunyadi. In 1443, Hunyadi launched an attack on Wallachia, defeating both the Ottoman forces and those loyal to Vlad Dracul, forcing the latter to negotiate with the Ottoman court for support, with Mircea II fleeing and going into hiding. However, Mircea II had a strong following and retained a strong army during this period. Hunyadi placed Basarab II on the throne, but with the support of the Ottomans, Vlad Dracul would regain the throne shortly thereafter. Mircea II supported his father but did not support his stance of siding with the Ottomans. Vlad Dracul signed a treaty with the Ottomans, which stated he would pay the usual annual tribute, as well as allowing two of his sons, Vlad Țepeș and Radu the Handsome (Fair), to be held as captives.

In October 1444, Vlad Dracul arrived near Nicopolis and tried to dissuade Vladislav III, king of Poland and Hungary, from continuing the Crusade of Varna. Polish historian Callimachus tells that the leaders of the crusade would not listen, so Vlad II went back to Wallachia, but not before he had left Mircea II in command of an auxiliary unit of 4,000 Wallachian cavalrymen. The unit participated in the Battle of Varna on 10 November 1444 and after the defeat, Mircea led the remainder of his unit and the Christian forces across the Danube. An able military commander, he successfully recaptured the fortress of Giurgiu in 1445. However, in yet another treaty with the Ottomans, his father allowed the Ottomans to again have control of the fortress in an effort to retain their support of his having the throne and in an effort to keep his two captive sons safe. In 1447, Hunyadi launched yet another attack against Wallachia, once more defeating the armies supporting Vlad Dracul and Mircea II, forcing Vlad Dracul to flee. Mircea II, however, was captured by Saxon elite, which were part of the ruling council in Tîrgoviște, and was blinded with a red-hot poker, then buried alive. His father was captured and killed shortly thereafter.

Following their deaths, his brother Vlad Țepeș was placed on the throne by the Ottomans but was soon forced out. Vlad Țepeș would regain the throne in 1456, and would also carry out vengeance against the Saxon elite, whom he held responsible for his father and brother's deaths. Vlad Țepeș would also fight successfully against the Ottomans for a number of years. Vlad's skilful political maneuverings, his capable administration skills and great tactical thinking, made him a very dangerous opponent to his enemies, which in turn would paint him as a ruthless, tyrannical leader.

Popular culture
 In Karen Chance's Cassandra Palmer series and Dorina Basarab series, Mircea Basarab features as the love interest of the former and father of the latter. He is also the North American Vampire Senate's chief negotiator. (Novels)
 In the comic strip Alley Oop, Mircea Ţepeş, a direct descendant of Mircea, appears in a series of strips published during 1981.
 In David Weber's novel Out of the Dark, there is a Romanian soldier named Mircea Basarab, who eventually reveals himself to be Vlad Ţepeş, who chose to take his brother's name after renouncing his vampiric nature.

References

Sources

External links
Vlad the Impaler
Wallachian Ruler Timeline

|-

Rulers of Wallachia
House of Drăculești
1428 births
1447 deaths
15th-century Romanian people
Christians of the Crusade of Varna
Premature burials